Skye Dawson  (born December 12, 1990) is a former American football wide receiver. He played college football for Texas Christian University. He was signed as undrafted free agent by the Washington Redskins in 2013. He also played for the Tampa Bay Buccaneers, Detroit Lions, Edmonton Eskimos and Calgary Stampeders.

Early years
Dawson attended Poteet High School (Mesquite, Texas) before transferring to Dallas Christian School. He was also a track and field standout.

College career
Dawson attended Texas Christian University, where he played for the TCU Horned Frogs football team from 2009 to 2012.

Professional career

Washington Redskins
Dawson was signed by the Washington Redskins on May 2, 2013, after going unselected in 2013 NFL Draft.  He was released during final cuts before the start of the 2013 season.

Tampa Bay Buccaneers
Dawson was signed onto the practice squad of the Tampa Bay Buccaneers on September 3, 2013. He was released on September 24, 2013, but re-signed the next day. The Buccaneers released Dawson on August 24, 2014.

Detroit Lions
Dawson was signed by the Wild Card Detroit Lions. This was his first time on a playoff squad.

Edmonton Eskimos

Dawson signed as a free agent with the Edmonton Eskimos on May 30, 2015. Before being placed on the injury list in Week 5, he returned eight kickoffs for 149 yards and 14 punts for 193 yards for the Canadian Football League team.

In September 2015, he was traded to the Calgary Stampeders.

Track and field
Dawson was ranked in the top 10 in the nation in the 100 meters coming out of high school. He Clocked a personal-best time of 10.22 seconds in the 100 meter at the Lancaster Meet of Champions. In 2008 Dawson won the state title in the 200 meter, clocking a time of 20.69 seconds. Dawson also competed in long jump.

Personal bests

References

External links
Tampa Bay Buccaneers bio
TCU Horned Frogs football bio
TCU Horned Frogs track bio

1990 births
Living people
American football wide receivers
Edmonton Elks players
Tampa Bay Buccaneers players
TCU Horned Frogs football players
Washington Redskins players